The 2010 parliamentary election in Venezuela took place on 26 September 2010 to elect the 165 deputies to the National Assembly. Venezuelan opposition parties, which had boycotted the previous election thus allowing  the governing Fifth Republic Movement (MVR) to gain a two-thirds super majority, participated in the election through the Coalition for Democratic Unity (MUD).  In  2007 the Fifth Republic Movement dissolved and the United Socialist Party of Venezuela was formed as the leading government party.  Nationally, the popular vote was split equally between PSUV and MUD, but PSUV won a majority of the first-past-the-post seats and consequently retained a substantial majority in the Assembly, although falling short of both two-thirds and three-fifths super majority marks.

Of the 165 deputies, 110 were constituency representatives elected on a first-past-the-post, the system in 87 electoral districts, 52 elected on a party list system (two or three deputies per state of Venezuela, depending on population), and 3 seats were reserved for indigenous peoples, with separate rules.

Additionally, 12 representatives were chosen for the Latin American Parliament.

There was initially a dispute between alliances that participated in the election as to which alliance received a plurality of votes. Each coalition was allowed to invite 30 foreign officials to observe the elections.

Background

Electoral changes
Elections for the National Assembly of Venezuela in the 2000 and the 2005 were conducted under a weak mixed member proportional system, with 60% elected in first-past-the-post electoral districts and the remainder by closed party list proportional representation. This was an adaptation of the system previously used for the Venezuelan Chamber of Deputies, which had been introduced in 1993, with a 50-50 balance between voting districts and party lists, and deputies per state proportional to population, but with a minimum of three deputies per state.

For the 2010 election, the Ley Orgánica de Procesos Electorales (LOPE) (Basic law of electoral process) among other changes reduced the party list proportion to 30%. In addition, the law completely separated the district vote and the party list votes, creating a more parallel system. Previously, parties winning nominal district seats had had these subtracted from the total won under the proportional party list, which had encouraged parties to game the system by creating separate parties for the party list. Under the new law, in 2009, electoral districts were redefined in a way that has been accused of favouring the PSUV, particularly in giving more weight to votes in the countryside over those in the city.

Electoral process
In August 2010 the CNE carried out vote simulations, with an average wait of 15–22 minutes. In August/September it also carried out a series of electoral fairs, providing 1500 vote machines in 11 cities for educational purposes, to allow voters to familiarize themselves with the process. As usual in Venezuela, the voting will take place on a non-work day, and the sale of alcohol will be banned starting the day prior to elections. Voting booth attendees are chosen at random by the CNE; for this election, over 400,000 were chosen. Over 80,000 participated in training, compared to 40,000 in 2005.

Four domestic NGOs registered 624 observers each. Unlike the election in 2005, major independent election observing organisations such as the Organization of American States, the European Union and the Carter Center were not invited to observe this election in a technical capacity. Guests from those bodies allowed to observe the final days of the election were not given the technical observation role they had been given in the past. Instead, each alliance participating in the election was permitted to bring "up to 30 witnesses from abroad." The European Union noted that "the Venezuelan National Electoral Council accredited more than 200 international guests to accompany the day of the election. No long-term international electoral observation missions participated." Foreign observers were warned in a full-page newspaper advertisement "not to interfere with the nation's internal affairs." An opposition spokesman said that "If observers were allowed to watch the campaign, they would have seen the abuse of power and of public resources and public media." The government's Roy Chaderton said that foreign observers were present and that comments like this from the opposition were "part of the media terrorism they like to practice".

The CNE monitors political advertisements during campaigns, and reported that for a 3-day period at the end of August, opposition ads made up 75.4% of the airtime given to such ads, across the five main channels Venevisión, Televen, Globovisión, Tves and Venezolana de Televisión. Over half the total opposition ad time of around 80 minutes was on Globovisión. President Hugo Chavez' weekly television program Aló Presidente was suspended during the election campaign (which officially began 25 August, one month before the election), until 3 October. A reporter for The Economist claimed that media controlled by the government gave "blanket coverage to the PSUV's campaign and token, hostile interviews to opposition candidates".

In early September, one member of the five-person CNE, the pro-opposition councillor Vicente Díaz, publicly accused Chavez of breaking campaign laws by using state-run television to "berate rivals and praise friends" during the election campaign. Chavez denied breaking the law, and said that Diaz could be prosecuted for making false accusations. Díaz requested the CNE open administrative proceedings, but after extensive internal discussion the CNE declined, and Díaz publicly "recognised Chavez's right to political expression as a citizen and also as president of the United Socialist Party of Venezuela." The opposition electoral coalition, Coalition for Democratic Unity (MUD) rejected the CNE decision, and said it illustrated CNE's lack of independence and willingness to justify violation of electoral rules.

Campaign
A total of 6,465 candidates registered with the National Electoral Council by the June deadline. Around 17.5 million of the country's 28.5 million population are eligible to vote. The ruling United Socialist Party of Venezuela (PSUV), with around 7 million members, is by far the largest party in the country by membership.

PSUV
In order to revise the party's statutes, programme, and primary voting methods, the ruling United Socialist Party of Venezuela planned a congress of 772 members representing the country's 759 municipalities. These members were elected by the members of the party in an election held on 15 November 2009. At this congress, beginning on 21 November 2009 and ending in March 2010, members were to debate each weekend over the new standards of the party, in which are included voting and selection method for the upcoming parliamentary elections. Primary elections were held on 2 May 2010, with over 2.5 million party members choosing over 3500 nominees for the 110 constituency representatives, in 87 electoral districts. Nominees for the PSUV party lists were announced later that month.

Opposition
The main Venezuelan opposition parties had boycotted the 2005 parliamentary election, unexpectedly withdrawing just before election day, despite a dispute over the voting process apparently having been resolved with the support of the Organization of American States (OAS). Eleven deputies subsequently defected to the opposition or declared themselves independent.

In June 2009, it was reported that the opposition parties were planning to create the Mesa de la Unidad Democrática (Coalition for Democratic Unity, MUD) a coalition that would include all of the opposition parties which might select unique candidates for the upcoming elections. A previous opposition umbrella group, the Coordinadora Democrática, had collapsed after the failure of the 2004 recall referendum.

By April 2010, the MUD included around 50 political parties, of which 16 were national in scope and the rest regional, and received support from some other social organisations and opinion groups. The main parties included in MUD are the traditional Democratic Action and COPEI (which held power from 1958 to 1998); the left groups Movement for Socialism, Radical Cause and Red Flag Party; and more recently established parties A New Era, Justice First and For Social Democracy ("PODEMOS"). In April the MUD held primaries in 15 electoral districts, with 361,000 voters participating, and selecting 22 candidates (the remaining 143 candidates were chosen "by consensus"). The candidates chosen included Maria Corina Machado (of Sumate) and Manuel Rosales, the opposition's candidate in the 2006 presidential election and now in exile in Peru (due to corruption charges, which he denies). In addition, a number of the nine police officials imprisoned for participating in the 2002 Venezuelan coup d'état attempt, regarded by the MUD as political prisoners, were also nominated, in districts with a real chance of opposition success; winning would require their release due to parliamentary immunity.

The MUD is supported by the Movimiento 2D opposition movement led by El Nacional editor and proprietor Miguel Henrique Otero.

Events
In mid-August 2010 El Nacional sparked an international outcry when its frontpage publication of a graphic archival photo of bodies in a morgue, to illustrate a story about rising crime rates, led the government to temporarily ban such publications. The ban was later overturned. El Nacional editor and proprietor Miguel Henrique Otero, leader of the opposition movement Movimiento 2D, said that "The editorial reasoning behind the photo was to create a shock so that people could in some way react to a situation that the government has done absolutely nothing about." The incident brought further international attention to the issue of Venezuela's crime rates (having already received widespread attention as a leading issue of public concern), and was followed by an article in The New York Times, claiming Venezuela's murder rate was higher than that of Iraq, although the comparison used Iraq Body Count's numbers derived from media reports rather than the World Health Organization's survey-based estimates, which are three times higher. A September 2010 poll conducted by Alfredo Keller & Associates confirmed that crime was the top concern for Venezuelans heading into the September 26 parliamentary elections, as it had been for some time.

At the end of August the death of Franklin Brito due to a hunger strike led to widespread domestic and international media coverage. He had, since 2004, launched a series of unsuccessful legal challenges and dramatic public protests (including a series of hunger strikes) against an alleged government confiscation of part of his farm. The government maintained that his protests were related to land legally owned by his neighbours, and that his final hunger strike came after the disputed land titles had been withdrawn from his neighbours. The government accused the Venezuelan opposition of acting like "vultures" and desiring Brito's death for their own political ends in the context of the coming election.

Opinion polls

Poll results are listed in the tables below in chronological order and using the date the results of the survey were published. The highest percentage figure in each polling survey is displayed in bold, and the background shaded in the leading party's colour.

Opinion polls vary widely, but the government-aligned GIS XXI (directed by former Chavez interior minister Jesse Chacón) consistently gives poll predictions more favourable to PSUV than other pollsters. GIS XXI's predictions for the February 2009 constitutional referendum just before polling day tallied closely with those of the independent Instituto Venezolano de Análisis de Datos (IVAD), and both closely matched the outcome (a nearly 10 percent margin of victory for approval); opposition-linked companies were predicting heavy defeat as late as December 2008.

In August 2010, the newspaper Últimas Noticias published what it said was the result of an unpublished opinion poll by Datanálisis, which showed the PSUV was likely to win 124 of the National Assembly's 165 seats, which would give it a two-thirds majority. Datanálisis later clarified that the results were a February 2010 extrapolation of the results of the last national election, the 2009 constitutional referendum.

Results
Complete results were available on 28 September, showing a turnout of 66.45%.  Out of 165 seats, the PSUV won 96, the MUD 64, the PPT 2, and three others were reserved for indigenous parties.

The election saw the PSUV retain 58.18% of the Assembly seats.  It thus lost its two-thirds majority in the assembly, and therefore would not be able to pass organic legislation on its own, without the support of at least some members of the MUD opposition.  The PSUV also did not attain a three-fifths majority, which means it would not be able to pass enabling legislation without the aid of 3 non-PSUV members of the National Assembly.

The three seats reserved for indigenous peoples were elected from the Foundation for Integration and Dignification, the Autonomous Movement of Zulia and from CONIVE.

By state

Elected representatives

Reaction
Chavez called the results a "solid victory."

The price on Venezuelan bonds increased on news of the election results, described by Bloomberg as "Chavez's worst setback at the ballot box since taking office in 1999".

Analysis
According to Reuters, "The new parliamentarians do not take their seats until January, so Chavez has a compliant Assembly for three months more to push through legislation."

After the election, the Spanish newspaper El País suggested that the PSUV and the MUD would have finished with 80 seats each had the elections been run under the previous system. The Director of the National Electoral Council (CNE) said that districts were drawn according to a standard national formula, and pointed out that the disproportionality involved in Venezuela's state-based mixed member majoritarian system didn't uniquely favour one party: in four states (Zulia, Tachira, Anzoategui and Nueva Esparta) PSUV obtained over 40% of the vote, but won only 7 seats against the opposition's 27.

References

Further reading

 Birnbaum, Ben. Washington Times, 23 September 2010,  "Venezuelan opposition faces hurdles in elections".
 Carroll, Rory.  The Guardian, 27 September 2010, "Venezuela election loosens Chávez's grip on power".
 Cawthorne, Andrew. Reuters, 27 September 2010, Analysis: Venezuela opposition buoyed for 2012 presidential race.
 Devereux, Charlie and Corina Rodriguez Pons. Business Week, 27 September 2010, "Venezuela's Opposition Pushes Back Chavez in Vote".
 Grant, Will.  BBC News, 27 September 2010, Frustration for Chavez over poll
 Jaramillo, Andrea. Bloomberg, 27 September 2010. Venezuelan Bonds Gain as Chavez Loses Congressional Seats in Worst Setback.
 Mogollon, Mery and Chris Kraul. Los Angeles Times, 27 September 2010, "Chavez's party loses its supermajority in Venezuela elections".
 Molinski, Dan and Jose de Cordoba.  The Wall Street Journal, 24 September 2010, "Chávez Faces Election Challenge".
 Romero, Simon.  The New York Times, 27 September 2010."Chávez Allies Win Majority, but Foes Make Gains".
 Romero, Simon. The New York Times, 26 September 2010. "Venezuelans Vote for Legislators".
 Toothaker, Christopher, The Associated Press, 27 September 2010."Chavez allies win congressional majority in vote".
 Toothaker, Christopher, The Washington Post, 27 September 2010, "Chavez allies see congressional majority cut back".
 The Economist, 23 September 2010, "Chávez grapples with a 50/50 nation".
 The Financial Times, 27 September 2010, "Opposition's poll gains threaten Chávez agenda".

2010 elections in South America
Elections in Venezuela
2010 in Venezuela
2010